Khosrow (also spelled Khusrow, Khusraw, Khusrau, Khusro, Chosro or Osro) may refer to:

 Khosrow (word), a given name also used as a title

Iranian rulers
 Khosrow I, Sasanian ruler 531–579 
 Khosrow II, Sasanian ruler 590–628 
 Khosrow III, Sasanian ruler 630
 Khosrow IV, Sasanian ruler 631–633
 Khosrow (son of Bahram IV), 420
 Khusrau Shah, sultan of the Ghaznavid Empire 1157–1160
 Khusrau Malik, last Sultan of the Ghaznavid Empire, 1160–1186
 Osroes I, c. 109–129
 Osroes II, c. 190

Kings of Armenia 

Khosrov I of Armenia, 198–217
 Khosrov II of Armenia, c. 252
 Khosrov III the Small, 330–339
 Khosrov IV of Armenia, 387–389

Other people

Given name
 Khosrov of Andzev (fl. 10th century), Armenian writer
 Khosrow Jahanbani (1941–2014), Iranian royal
 Khusrau Khan, Sultan of Delhi for four months in 1320 
 Khusrau Mirza (1587–1622), son of Mughal emperor Jahangir
 Khosrov bey Sultanov (1879–1947), Azerbaijani statesman
 Khosrov Harutyunyan (b. 1948), Armenian politician

Middle name
 Amir Khosrow Afshar (1919–1999), Iranian diplomat and politician

Surname
 Amir Khusrau (1253–1325), Sufi poet (in Persian language), musician, and scholar of India
 Kay Khosrow, an Iranian legendary king

Places
Khosrow, Iran (disambiguation), several places
Khosrov, Armenia
Khosrov Forest State Reserve, in Armenia
Xosrov, Azerbaijan

Other uses
 Khosrow and Shirin, a tragic romance by Persian poet Nizami Ganjavi
 Khusrau (crater), on Saturn's moon Enceladus

See also

 Hüsrev, the Turkish language equivalent
 Kaykhusraw (disambiguation)
 Cosroe Dusi (1808–1859), Italian painter
 Khosrovidukht
 Khosrowshahi

Persian masculine given names
Armenian masculine given names